Family Diary is a 1962 Italian film directed by Valerio Zurlini and based on the novel by Vasco Pratolini. It tells the story of two brothers (played by Marcello Mastroianni and Jacques Perrin) who are brought up apart from each other at their mother's death, then brought together by difficult family circumstances.

Described by Elliot Stein in The Village Voice as "the classiest 'male weepie' ever filmed", Family Diary is an exemplary adaptation of the semi-autobiographical Vasco Pratolini novel Two Brothers, and won Zurlini a shared Golden Lion at the Venice Film Festival.

Marcello Mastroianni gives a sensitive, finely judged performance as Enrico, a struggling journalist in the Rome of 1945. He receives a phone call informing him that his younger brother Lorenzo (Jacques Perrin) has died. Enrico recalls their long and difficult relationship; he was brought up by their poor but warm-hearted grandmother (Sylvie), while Lorenzo was raised as a gentleman by a wealthy local aristocrat. Reunited in the Florence of the 1930s, Enrico becomes his spoiled brother's keeper, forever haunted by a sense of guilt and responsibility towards a man he both hates and loves.

Beautifully photographed by Giuseppe Rotunno, this austere, deeply felt masterwork has been acclaimed as one of Zurlini's greatest achievements.

Cast
 Marcello Mastroianni - Enrico
 Jacques Perrin - Lorenzo
 Sylvie - Grandmother
 Salvo Randone - Salocchi
 Valeria Ciangottini - Enzina
 Serena Vergano - Hospital Nun
 Marco Guglielmi
 Franca Pasut
 Miranda Campa
 Nino Fuscagni
 Marcella Valeri

References

External links 
 
 
 Martha King's English translation of  Cronaca familiare as  Family Chronicle.

1962 films
Italian drama films
1960s Italian-language films
1962 drama films
Golden Lion winners
Titanus films
Films directed by Valerio Zurlini
Films set in Florence
1960s Italian films